This is a list of lighthouses in Madeira.

Lighthouses

See also
 List of lighthouses in Portugal

References

External links

 

Madeira
Lighthouses